John Fitzpatrick or FitzPatrick may refer to:

Sportspeople
 John Fitzpatrick (athlete) (1907–1989), Canadian sprinter
 John Fitzpatrick (baseball) (1904–1990), American baseball coach
 John Fitzpatrick (cricketer) (1889–1952), Australian cricketer
 John Fitzpatrick (footballer, born 1946) (1946–2020), Scottish footballer
 John Fitzpatrick (Irish footballer), Irish soccer player during the 1890s
 John Fitzpatrick (racing driver) (born 1943), English racing driver
 J. R. Fitzpatrick (John Ryan Fitzpatrick, born 1988), Canadian racing driver
 John Fitzpatrick (hurler) (1905–1990), Irish hurler
 John FitzPatrick (American football) (born 2000), American football player

Politics
 John FitzPatrick (Australian federal politician) (1915–1997), Australian politician
 John Fitzpatrick (New South Wales politician) (1862–1932), Australian politician and journalist
 John Fitzpatrick (unionist) (1871–1946), Irish-American union leader 
 John FitzPatrick, 1st Baron Castletown (1811–1883), Irish politician
 John FitzPatrick, 1st Earl of Upper Ossory (1719–1758), Irish peer and member of Parliament 
 John FitzPatrick, 2nd Earl of Upper Ossory (1745–1818), Irish peer and member of Parliament
 John Lalor Fitzpatrick (1875–1956), Irish member of Parliament

Others
 John Fitzpatrick (mayor) (1844–1919), Irish-American politician
 John Bernard Fitzpatrick (1812–1866), American Roman Catholic bishop
 John Clement Fitzpatrick (1876–1940), American archivist and historian
 John F. Fitzpatrick (1887–1960), American publisher
 John Joseph Fitzpatrick (1918–2006), American Roman Catholic bishop
 John Kelly Fitzpatrick (1888–1953), American painter 
 John M. Fitzpatrick (1948–2014), Irish urologist 
 John W. Fitzpatrick (born 1951), American ornithologist

See also 
 Fitzpatrick (surname)
 Fitzpatrick (disambiguation)